Geomyza is a genus of flies in the family Opomyzidae. There are at least 30 described species in Geomyza.

Species
These 39 species belong to the genus Geomyza:

 Geomyza acutipennis Czerny, 1928 c g
 Geomyza adusta (Loew, 1873) c g
 Geomyza advena Frey, 1960 c g
 Geomyza alluaudi (Hendel, 1917) c g
 Geomyza angustipennis Zetterstedt, 1847 c g
 Geomyza annae Martinek, 1978 c g
 Geomyza apicalis (Meigen, 1830) c g
 Geomyza balachowskyi Mesnil, 1934 c g b
 Geomyza bifida Carles-Tolra, 1993 c g
 Geomyza breviforceps Hackman, 1958 c g
 Geomyza breviseta Czerny, 1928 c g
 Geomyza chuana Yang, 1997 c g
 Geomyza combinata (Linnaeus, 1767) c g
 Geomyza coquilletti (Hendel, 1917) c g
 Geomyza denigrata Czerny, 1928 c g
 Geomyza dolomata Vockeroth, 1961 c g
 Geomyza elbergi Nartshuk, 1993 c g
 Geomyza envirata Vockeroth, 1965 c g
 Geomyza hackmani Nartshuk, 1984 c g
 Geomyza hissarica Nartshuk, 1993 c g
 Geomyza kazakhstanica Nartshuk, 1993 c g
 Geomyza lurida (Loew, 1864) c g
 Geomyza majuscula (Loew, 1864) c g
 Geomyza martineki Drake, 1992 c g
 Geomyza monticola Vockeroth, 1961 c g
 Geomyza nartshukae Carles-Tolra, 1993 c g
 Geomyza nubilipuncta Vockeroth, 1965 c g
 Geomyza opaca (Dahl, 1912) c g
 Geomyza paganettii (Strobl, 1909) c g
 Geomyza parvistigma Vockeroth, 1961 c g
 Geomyza pilosula Czerny, 1928 c g
 Geomyza silvatica Yang, 1995 c g
 Geomyza subnigra Drake, 1992 c g
 Geomyza tripunctata Fallen, 1823 c g b (cereal fly)
 Geomyza tundrarum Nartshuk, 1993 c g
 Geomyza velata Vockeroth, 1961 c g
 Geomyza venusta (Meigen, 1830) c g
 Geomyza vespertina Vockeroth, 1961 c g
 Geomyza zumetae Carles-Tolra, 1995 c g

Data sources: i = ITIS, c = Catalogue of Life, g = GBIF, b = Bugguide.net

References

Further reading

External links

 
 

Opomyzidae
Schizophora genera
Taxa named by Carl Fredrik Fallén